Attorney General Woodruff may refer to:

Aaron Woodruff (1762–1817), Attorney General of New Jersey
George Washington Woodruff (1864–1934), Attorney General of Pennsylvania

See also
General Woodruff (disambiguation)